Bhalchandra Vaman Kelkar (September 23, 1920 – November 6, 1987) was a Marathi writer and actor, from Maharashtra, India.  He was one of the founders of Progressive Dramatic Association in Pune.

Bhalba Kelkar was also known for writing biographies of Indian scientists for children.

Notes 

Marathi-language writers
1920 births
1987 deaths